Government degree college is a leading college in kohat, kpk Pakistan.

History
The school was established with primary level classes in 2019 BS (1962 CE). The first School Leaving Certificate (SLC) students were six in number, in 2044 BS (1987 CE). In 2063 SLC (2006 CE), a contingent of 244 students took SLC examinations.

Curriculum
In the academic year 2061 (2004 CE), the school started 10+2 programs in Science and Management. Humanities was added in 2062 (2005 CE). The school extended its programs to include BBS (Bachelor of Business Studies) from 2066 (2009 AD)

Academic achievement
The school has a pass-rate of over 80% in SLC for the last several years.

External links
 Basu Higher Secondary School

Educational institutions established in 1962
Schools in Nepal

1962 establishments in Nepal